In Watermelon Sugar is an American postmodern post-apocalyptic novel by Richard Brautigan written in 1964 and published in 1968. 

Set in the aftermath of a fallen civilization, it focuses on a commune organized around a central gathering house which is named "iDEATH". In this environment, many things are made of watermelon sugar (though the inhabitants also use pine wood and stone for building material and fuel made from trout oil). The landscape of the novel is constantly in flux; each day of the week has a different colored sun which creates different colored watermelons, and the central building also changes frequently. The novel's narrator, who is left unnamed, claims to be writing an investigative book on his experiences at iDEATH. Its first-person narrative is sparse and minimalist, granting the novel a detached and alien quality.

Plot
Through the narrator's first-person account we learn the story of the people and the events of iDEATH. The central tension is created by Margaret, once a lover of the narrator, and inBOIL, a rebellious man who has left iDEATH to live near a forbidden area called the Forgotten Works, a huge trash heap where the remnants of a former civilization lie abandoned in great piles. Margaret, a collector of such "forgotten things", is friendly with inBOIL and his followers, who explore the place and make whiskey.

inBOIL's separation from the group may have been related to the annihilation of the tigers, killed many years previously by the people. It is not clear to the reader whether the tigers were actual tigers, human beings or somehow anthropomorphic: they killed and ate people, including the narrator's parents, but they could also talk, sing, and play musical instruments, and were at least competent with arithmetic. Two tigers were killed on a bridge known later as the "abandoned" bridge. The last tiger was killed on a spot later developed into a trout farm.

In the violent climax of the novel, inBOIL returns to the community along with a handful of followers, planning, he says, to show the residents what iDEATH really is. The residents know only that something is about to happen. After leading members of the community to the trout hatchery, inBOIL and his followers commit suicide, dismembering their faces with jackknives. Margaret appears oblivious to the threats, and unconcerned about the safety of her family and friends. Many suspect that Margaret knew and did not reveal details of inBOIL's real plan, thus "conspiring" with the evil men. She is semi-ostracized from iDEATH. At the beginning of the novel the narrator reveals that he ended their relationship because of these events.

Interpretations
The concept of iDEATH is subject to various interpretations. It can be seen as a new Eden in a post-apocalyptic world, with the old destroyed world represented by the Forgotten Works, connecting the narrator and his new lover to Adam and Eve. The novel alludes to communal experiments of the 1960s, involving the intersection of nature and technology. For example, the iDEATH building seems to have been constructed around nature, rather than displacing it; the building houses many trees, rocks, a creek, and a trout hatchery. Brautigan himself said he based the book on his life in Bolinas, whose inhabitants were at that time known for their semi-communal and insular ways.

In a 1992 assessment of the novel, literary critic Patrick Morrow wrote: "It is possible to give an ironic reading to In Watermelon Sugar, but this would entail a psychological interpretation of the fable, and fables are traditionally black and white — issue-directed, not motivation- and character-directed." The novel is considered a work of postmodern fiction. Literary critic Carolyn Kelly commented on the novel's setting, writing: Indeed, the perfected world of this novel does not work. Brautigan's silence speaks loudly as he presents what seems to be a parody of the pastoral. This society may represent what modern man might wish it to be—an answer to or a substitute for the mechanistic, profit-seeking, inhumane world of social and moral decadence in which he finds himself, but the distortion in the new society is also obvious and just as unattractive. Viewing this book, then, as a parody of the pastoral, one might consider the ideas that are implied by the silence and attempt to determine what Brautigan's attitude is toward this "perfect" society.

Allusions in other works 

In Watermelon Sugar is referenced in Ray Mungo's book on his experiences founding and running the Total Loss Farm commune in Vermont. He speaks of iDEATH several times. Stephen Gaskin, who wrote that he felt an "acid weird" and "strange mythology" in the book, may have based some aspects of The Farm commune in Summertown, Tennessee on iDEATH.

The titles and characters are also used as lyrics in a song by new rave band Klaxons in their song "Forgotten Works", that features on their album Myths of the Near Future. 

Neko Case references this book as the inspiration for her song "Margaret versus Pauline" on the album Fox Confessor Brings the Flood.

The setting of the novel is also referenced in song "The Tigers" by the band Goodbye Kumiko. iDEATH is also briefly referenced in the "New Traveler's Almanac" section of The League of Extraordinary Gentlemen Volume 2. 

In Watermelon Sugar is also referenced multiple times in the Dean Koontz novel, One Door Away from Heaven, by an important secondary character who believes, in her near-constant drug-soaked haze, that she would unlock the secrets of the universe if she could only understand this book properly. 

The main character of the 1998 Wally Lamb novel I Know This Much Is True reads and references In Watermelon Sugar throughout the novel. 

Harry Styles shared, during a February 2020 Tiny Desk Concert, that a copy of the book inspired the title of his song "Watermelon Sugar".

References

Notes

Sources

Further reading

External links 
 
In Watermelon Sugar at Encyclopædia Britannica

1968 American novels
American novellas
American post-apocalyptic novels
Experimental literature
Novels by Richard Brautigan
Postmodern novels
Books with cover art by Edmund Shea
First-person narrative novels